Ochrolechia cooperi is a species of crustose lichen in the family Ochrolechiaceae. Occurring only in southern Alaska, it was formally described as a new species in 2020 by lichenologist Toby Spribille. The type specimen was collected in the Hoonah-Angoon Census Area of Glacier Bay National Park, northeast of Gustavus. Here the lichen was found in muskeg growing on a conifer log that still had its bark. The specific epithet honors American ecologist William Skinner Cooper, "whose studies on plant succession in Glacier Bay and subsequent political lobbying efforts were influential in the establishment of Glacier Bay as a National Monument in 1925".

Some distinguishing features of Ochrolechia cooperi include the creamy white thallus with numerous coral-like outgrowths of isidia, and the rare occurrence of apothecia. The lichen has the secondary chemicals gyrophoric acid and lecanoric acid. The photobiont partner of this lichen is a chlorococcoid green alga with a diameter of 10–15 μm.

References

Pertusariales
Lichen species
Lichens described in 2020
Lichens of Subarctic America
Taxa named by Toby Spribille
Fungi without expected TNC conservation status